Ian Checcio is a retired American soccer player who played professionally in the USL A-League.

Checcio played youth soccer with FC Delco.  In 1994, Checcio graduated from Radnor High School where he was a multi-year letterman in baseball, basketball and soccer.  Checcio attended Rutgers University, playing on the men’s soccer team from 1994 to 1997.  In 1998, the Staten Island Vipers selected Checcio with the last pick in the A-League Draft.  Over the next five seasons, Checcio played for a different team each year.  In February 2001, Checcio moved to the Atlanta Silverbacks.  He finished his career in 2002 with the Hampton Roads Mariners.

References

Living people
1975 births
American soccer players
Atlanta Silverbacks players
Virginia Beach Mariners players
Lehigh Valley Steam players
Staten Island Vipers players
A-League (1995–2004) players
Rutgers Scarlet Knights men's soccer players
Association football midfielders
Association football defenders